The 2003 Kenya Appeal Judges Tribunal was a tribunal set up  on 15 October 2003 to investigate the conduct of appellate judges of the Court of Appeal of Kenya following the 2003 Ringera Judiciary Report.

Terms of reference
President Mwai Kibaki established a tribunal which was to investigate the conduct the following judges:
 Richard Otieno Kwach
 Amaritral B. Shah
 A.A. Lakha
 Moijo M. ole Keiwua
 Effie Owuor
 Philip. N. Waki

The tribunal was to investigate the allegations that the judges were involved in corruption, unethical practices and absence of integrity in the performance of the functions of their office make a report with recommendations to the president. 

The judges were suspended from exercising the functions of their office during the tribunal's investigation. The decisions of the tribunal were appealed and some of the judges reinstated. The tribunal was also sued by some of the judges who were being investigated.

Membership
The tribunal consisted of:
 Justice (Rtd) Akilano Molande Akiwumi
 Justice (Rtd) Abdul Majid Cockar
 Justice Benjamin Patrick Kubo
 Philip Nzamba Kitonga
 William Shirley Deverell

The tribunal was to be supported by Mbuthi Gathenji as assisting counsel and Margaret Nzioka as secretary. The two court clerks attached to the tribunal were Michael Mkala Maghanga and Stephen Ngugi.

See also
 Court of Appeal of Kenya
 High Court of Kenya

References

Judiciary of Kenya
2003 in Kenya